Eressa aperiens is a moth of the family Erebidae. It was described by Francis Walker in 1865. It is found in India (Nilgiris, Bombay).

References

External links
 

Eressa
Moths described in 1865